In 1989, Rubaiya Sayeed, the daughter of the then Indian Home Minister Mufti Mohammad Sayeed, was kidnapped by Kashmiri separatist militants in Srinagar, the capital of Jammu and Kashmir. The kidnappers demanded the release of five jailed members of Jammu Kashmir Liberation Front (JKLF) in exchange for Sayeed's release. The Indian government headed by V. P. Singh of the Janata Dal party, with outside support from the BJP, agreed to the demands and induced the state government to release the jailed militants. In 2004, the JKLF admitted to having carried out the kidnapping,  and the court case is ongoing. In July 2022, Rubaiya identified Yasin Malik, one of the key leaders of JKLF at that time, as one of her kidnappers.

Rubaiya Sayeed 

Rubaiya Sayeed, the third daughter of Mufti Mohammad Sayeed was then 23 years old, and a medical intern at Lal Ded Memorial Women's Hospital.

Modus operandi 

She was kidnapped at 3:45 p.m. on 8 December 1989, about 500 metres from her home at Nowgam when she was returning from the Lal Ded Memorial Women's Hospital in a local mini bus. Four people forced her out of the vehicle at gunpoint into a waiting Maruti car and disappeared. The kidnapping was done by J K Liberation Front run by Yasin Malik,.

Demands of abductors and negotiations 
Representatives of  the Jammu and Kashmir Liberation Front telephoned the local newspaper Kashmir Times at about 5:30 p.m., stating that their group's mujahideen had kidnapped Dr Rubaiya Sayeed, and that she would remain their hostage until the government released Sheikh Abdul Hameed, a JKLF "area commander" Ghulam Nabi Butt, younger brother of  the convicted and hanged rebel Maqbool Butt; Noor Muhammad Kalwal; Muhammed Altaf; and Mushtaq Ahmed Zargar.

The editor, Muhammad Sofi, phoned both the Home Minister and the government to pass on the news. The chief minister Farooq Abdullah cut short his holiday in London and returned to Delhi. Senior IB and police officials, including Ved Marwah, Director General of the National Security Guards, reached Srinagar before dawn the next day.

The negotiations opened through Zaffar Meraj of the Kashmir Times, while Shabnam Lone, daughter of A.B. Ghani Lone and Maulvi Abbas Ansari of the Muslim United Front were tapped as possible channels. Later, a judge of the Allahabad High Court, Moti Lal Bhat, entered the picture. A friend of Mufti, he began negotiating directly with the militants on behalf of the home minister.

At 3:30 a.m. on 13 December 1989, two Union Cabinet Ministers, Inder Kumar Gujral and Arif Mohammad Khan, personally flew into Srinagar, believing that Farooq was coming in the way of a deal because Farooq held the view that abject surrender to the militants' demands would open the floodgates.

At 7:00 p.m. on 13 December 1989 Dr. Rubaiya Sayeed was set free, two hours after the government released the five jailed militants. Thousands of young men gathered at Rajouri Kadal to take them out in a triumphant procession, but they quickly disappeared to their hideouts.

Aftermath 
Years later Farooq Abdullah claimed that his government was threatened with dismissal by the central government if the militants were not exchanged for Rubaiya.  The kidnapping set the stage for heightened militancy in the state, and the mass support for militants could be clearly seen in the streets. Many say the abduction was the watershed in the Kashmir insurgency. Had the V P Singh government not buckled down, things would have been different," they say, "The JKLF would not have harmed Rubaiya due to public sentiment. In 1999 three JKLF militants Shoukat Ahmed Bakshi, Manzoor Ahmed Sofi, and Mohammad Iqbal Gandroo were granted bail after 9 years.

Yasin Malik is currently under trial for the kidnapping and exchange of five militants.

See also 
Mufti Mohammad Sayeed
Mushtaq Ahmed Zargar

References

Further reading
 

Hostage taking
Terrorist incidents in India in 1989
1989 crimes in India
Terrorist incidents in Jammu and Kashmir
Kidnappings in India
1980s in Jammu and Kashmir
Terrorism in Jammu and Kashmir